Mzumbe University (MU) is a public university in Mzumbe, Tanzania, near Morogoro. It was established in 2001.

Academic units 
Below are the academic units and their acronyms in brackets respectively;

 School of Business (SoB)
 School of Administration and Management (SoAM)
 Faculty of Law (FoL)
 Faculty of Social Sciences (FSS)
 Faculty of Science and Technology (FST)
 Institute of Development Studies (IDS)
 Directorate of Research, Publications and Postgraduate Studies (DRPS)

References

External links
Official website

 
Public universities in Tanzania
Universities in Morogoro
Educational institutions established in 2001
Association of African Universities
2001 establishments in Tanzania